Hylodesmum is a genus of flowering plants in the family Fabaceae, sometimes called ticktrefoils or tick-trefoils. It is sometimes treated as part of Desmodium.

Species
Species in Hylodesmum include:
 Hylodesmum densum
 Hylodesmum glutinosum
 Hylodesmum lancangense
 Hylodesmum laterale
 Hylodesmum laxum
 Hylodesmum leptopus
 Hylodesmum longipes
 Hylodesmum menglaense
 Hylodesmum nudiflorum
 Hylodesmum oldhamii
 Hylodesmum oxyphyllum
 Hylodesmum pauciflorum
 Hylodesmum podocarpum
 Hylodesmum repandum
 Hylodesmum szechuanense
 Hylodesmum williamsii

References

Desmodieae
Fabaceae genera